Pugilina is a genus of large sea snails, marine gastropod mollusks in the family Melongenidae, the crown conches and their allies.

Species
Species within the genus Pugilina include:
 Pugilina elongata nhatrangensis Thach, 2018 (parent: Brunneifusus ternatanus (Gmelin, 1791))  
 † Pugilina erecta Vermeij & Raven, 2009 
 † Pugilina katalinae Kovács & Vicián, 2016 
 Pugilina morio (Linnaeus, 1758)
 † Pugilina paraguanensis Landau & Vermeij, 2013 
 Pugilina tupiniquim Abbate & Simone, 2015
Species brought into synonymy
 Subgenus Pugilina (Hemifusus) Swainson, 1840: synonym of Hemifusus Swainson, 1840
 Pugilina carnaria Röding, 1798: synonym of Volegalea carnaria (Röding, 1798)
 Pugilina cochlidium (Linnaeus, 1758): synonym of Volegalea cochlidium (Linnaeus, 1758)
 Pugilina colosseus Lamarck, 1816: synonym of Hemifusus colosseus (Lamarck, 1816)
 Pugilina crassicaudus Philippi, 1849: synonym of Hemifusus crassicauda (Philippi, 1849) 
 Pugilina dirki Nolf, 2007: synonym of Volegalea dirki (Nolf, 2007)
 Pugilina kawamurai: synonym of Hemifusus kawamurai T. Kira, 1965
 Pugilina laevis Schumacher, 1817: synonym of Volema pyrum (Gmelin, 1791)
 Pugilina pugilina (Born, 1778): synonym of Volegalea cochlidium (Linnaeus, 1758)
 Pugilina ternatanus (Gmelin, 1791): synonym of Hemifusus ternatanus (Gmelin, 1791): synonym of Brunneifusus ternatanus (Gmelin, 1791)
 Pugilina tuba  Gmelin, 1791: synonym of Hemifusus tuba (Gmelin, 1791)

References

 Vaught, K.C. (1989). A classification of the living Mollusca. American Malacologists: Melbourne, FL (USA). . XII, 195 pp.

External links
 

Melongenidae